Mutant Mindframe is the debut solo studio album by American rapper from Big Gipp of Goodie Mob. It was released in 2003 under Koch Records. It features guest appearances from Gator Boy, André 3000, Big Rube, 8Ball, Khujo, Sleepy Brown, Slimm Calhoun, T-Mo and Witchdoctor. The album peaked at #161 on the Billboard 200 albums chart in the United States.

In the CD booklet, Gipp gives the following words of advice:

Let this be an example . . . originality works for those who have the patience to wait."

Track listing

Charts

References

External links

E1 Music albums
2003 debut albums
Dungeon Family albums